Beckum is a small village  south of Hengelo, Netherlands. The village lies in the municipality of Hengelo, between Hengelo and Haaksbergen.

It was first mentioned in 1268 as Beckem, and might mean "settlement along a brook". In 1840, it was home to 304 people. At the centre of the village is the Roman Catholic Church of St. Blasius, built in 1938. The postal authorities have placed it under Haaksbergen.

References

External links
 http://www.beckum.nl (Dutch)

Populated places in Overijssel
Hengelo